The NFL Championships describes both the Championship games of the National Football League, which ran from 1920 to 1969; and the Super Bowl, which has run from 1966 to the present. Many players and teams have won these championships on multiple occasions, both during the NFL Championships and the Super Bowl era. The majority of these players were on the Green Bay Packers between 1960 and 1967, a period in which the Packers won three NFL Championships and the first two Super Bowl games.

Seven championships

 Tom Brady (quarterback) won Super Bowls XXXVI, XXXVIII, XXXIX, XLIX, LI, and LIII with the New England Patriots after the 2001, 2003, 2004, 2014, 2016, and 2018 seasons, respectively. He won Super Bowl LV with the Tampa Bay Buccaneers after the 2020 season.

Six championships
Three players have won six championships counting the pre-Super Bowl era. To avoid double counting from 1966 to 1969, only the NFL championships from 1920–1965 and the Super Bowls from 1966 onward are counted.
 	
Fuzzy Thurston (offensive lineman) won the NFL championships with the Baltimore Colts in 1958, with the Green Bay Packers in 1961, 1962 and 1965, and won Super Bowls I and II with the Packers after the 1966 and 1967 seasons, respectively.
Forrest Gregg (offensive lineman) won the NFL championships with the Green Bay Packers in 1961, 1962 and 1965, Super Bowls I and II with the Packers after the 1966 and 1967 seasons, respectively, and Super Bowl VI with the Dallas Cowboys after the 1971 season.
Herb Adderley (defensive back) won the NFL championships with the Green Bay Packers in 1961, 1962 and 1965, Super Bowls I and II with the Packers after the 1966 and 1967 seasons, respectively, and Super Bowl VI with the Dallas Cowboys after the 1971 season.

Five championships
13 players have won 5 championships counting the pre-Super Bowl era; with the exception of Charles Haley, all were from the 1960s Packers.

Bart Starr (quarterback) won the NFL championships with the Green Bay Packers in 1961, 1962 and 1965, Super Bowls I and II with the Packers after the 1966 and 1967 seasons, respectively.
Jerry Kramer (offensive lineman) won the NFL championships with the Green Bay Packers in 1961, 1962 and 1965, Super Bowls I and II with the Packers after the 1966 and 1967 seasons, respectively.
Ray Nitschke (linebacker) won the NFL championships with the Green Bay Packers in 1961, 1962 and 1965, Super Bowls I and II with the Packers after the 1966 and 1967 seasons, respectively.
Henry Jordan (defensive lineman) won the NFL championships with the Green Bay Packers in 1961, 1962 and 1965, Super Bowls I and II with the Packers after the 1966 and 1967 seasons, respectively.
Willie Davis (defensive lineman) won the NFL championships with the Green Bay Packers in 1961, 1962 and 1965, Super Bowls I and II with the Packers after the 1966 and 1967 seasons, respectively.
Willie Wood (defensive back) won the NFL championships with the Green Bay Packers in 1961, 1962 and 1965, Super Bowls I and II with the Packers after the 1966 and 1967 seasons, respectively.
Max McGee (wide receiver) won the NFL championships with the Green Bay Packers in 1961, 1962 and 1965, Super Bowls I and II with the Packers after the 1966 and 1967 seasons, respectively.
Bob Skoronski (offensive lineman) won the NFL championships with the Green Bay Packers in 1961, 1962 and 1965, Super Bowls I and II with the Packers after the 1966 and 1967 seasons, respectively.
Elijah Pitts (running back) won the NFL championships with the Green Bay Packers in 1961, 1962 and 1965, Super Bowls I and II with the Packers after the 1966 and 1967 seasons, respectively.
Ron Kostelnik (defensive lineman) won the NFL championships with the Green Bay Packers in 1961, 1962 and 1965, Super Bowls I and II with the Packers after the 1966 and 1967 seasons, respectively.
Boyd Dowler (wide receiver) won the NFL championships with the Green Bay Packers in 1961, 1962 and 1965, Super Bowls I and II with the Packers after the 1966 and 1967 seasons, respectively.
Marv Fleming (tight end) won the NFL championships with the Green Bay Packers in 1965, Super Bowls I and II with the Packers after the 1966 and 1967 seasons, respectively, and Super Bowls VII and VIII with the Dolphins after the 1972 and 1973 seasons, respectively.
Charles Haley (defensive lineman) won Super Bowls XXIII, and XXIV with the 49ers after the 1988 and 1989 seasons, respectively, and Super Bowls XXVII, XXVIII and XXX with the Cowboys after the 1992, 1993 and 1995 seasons, respectively.

List of players with most Super Bowl championships

References

Championships
Super Bowl lists
National Football League
National Football League Championship games